INS Mysore was a Fiji-class light cruiser commissioned in the Indian Navy in 1957.

Mysore was the second cruiser to be purchased by independent India. She was commissioned into the Indian Navy in August 1957. The crest for Mysore depicted the mythological double-headed eagle Gandaberunda from the coat of arms of the former Mysore state. The ship's motto Na bibheti kadachana was taken from the Taittiriya Upanishad.

Operational history

In 1959, Mysore rammed the Royal Navy destroyer , severely damaging Hogues bow. In 1969, she collided with the destroyer Rana resulting in the latter being decommissioned and again in 1972 with the frigate Beas. Mysore served as a crucible of training. On her several Indian naval officers earned their stripes as her successive commanding officers. In 1971 she served as the flagship of the Western Fleet of the Indian Navy and commanded the missile attack on Karachi harbour in December 1971. Later in her life from 1975 onwards Mysore served as a training cruiser for naval cadets.

Mysore was decommissioned on 20 August 1985 and scrapped.

In popular culture
Mysore appears in the 2016 Bollywood movie Rustom, which was based loosely on the popular K. M. Nanavati v. State of Maharashtra case of the 1960s.

References

HMS Nigeria at Uboat.net

 

Crown Colony-class cruisers of the Indian Navy
Ships built on the River Tyne
1939 ships